The UK Cup Clash was an annual sound clash held in London since 2001. The series, which was sponsored by BBC Radio 1Xtra, was interrupted in 2008, though plans were underway to stage it again in 2013.

Winners
2002: Mighty Crown
2003: Tony Matterhorn
2004: Black Kat
2005: Mighty Crown 
2006: Bass Odyssey
2007: Bass Odyssey
2008: Bass Odyssey

2009: Shashamane International
2014: Bass Odyssey

References

Dancehall
Music competitions in the United Kingdom
Reggae culture
2001 establishments in the United Kingdom
Recurring events established in 2001
Annual events in the United Kingdom